The Thesaurus of the Guarani Language is a Classical Guarani–Spanish bilingual dictionary written by the Peruvian Jesuit priest and scholar Antonio Ruiz de Montoya. It was published in 1639.
The Thesaurus was the first Guarani–Spanish dictionary. It gives examples of contexts in which to use the various words.

References

1639 books
Guarani languages
Translation dictionaries